Christopher Sorrene Makengo (born 7 July 1994) is a French footballer who plays as a midfielder for ASM Belfort.

References

1994 births
Living people
French footballers
Association football midfielders
Slovenian PrvaLiga players
Championnat National 2 players
Thunder Bay Chill players
NK Aluminij players
Niki Volos F.C. players
SAS Épinal players
AS Béziers Hérault (football) players
ASM Belfort players
French expatriate footballers
French expatriate sportspeople in Canada
Expatriate soccer players in Canada
French expatriate sportspeople in Slovenia
Expatriate footballers in Slovenia
French expatriate sportspeople in Greece
Expatriate footballers in Greece